Zăicana is a village in Criuleni District, Moldova.

References

Villages of Criuleni District